CA1, CA-1, CA 1, or Ca.1  may refer to:

Aircraft and other vehicles 
 Buhl CA-1 Airster, an American sports airplane
 Caproni Ca.1 (1910), an experimental biplane of 1910
 Caproni Ca.1 (1914), a World War I bomber
 Schneider CA1, the first French tank

Biology 
 CA1 (gene), a human gene
 CA1, a subfield or region of the hippocampus proper

Places and roads 
 the road designation for the Central American Highway 1 (CA-1), the portion of the Pan-American Highway passing through the Central American countries
 California State Route 1
 California's 1st congressional district